Catherine Sofikitis is a New Hampshire politician.

Career
On November 8, 2016, Sofikitis was elected to the New Hampshire House of Representatives where he represents the Hillsborough 34 district. Sofikitis assumed office in 2016. Sofikitis is a Democrat. Sofikitis endorses Bernie Sanders in the 2020 Democratic Party presidential primaries.

Personal life
Sofikitis resides in Nashua, New Hampshire.  Sofikitis is married and has one child.

References

Living people
Women state legislators in New Hampshire
People from Nashua, New Hampshire
Democratic Party members of the New Hampshire House of Representatives
21st-century American women politicians
21st-century American politicians
Year of birth missing (living people)